FVT may refer to:

Final value theorem
Fire Victim Trust
Flash vacuum thermolysis
Future Vision Technologies
Field Vain Test
Future Vehicle Technologies
FVT Research Inc.